Richard Aldrich is a Brooklyn-based painter who exhibited in the 2010 Whitney Biennial.

Early life and education
Aldrich received his BFA degree from the Ohio State University in 1998.

Career and work
Although mostly abstract and casual, Aldrich's paintings also betray a distinctly literary sensibility, even as he targets what he has called the essential "unwordliness of experience." Snippets of text and random words-UFO, the numeral 4-appear as decals or pencil scrawls, while lines incised with the back of a brush suggest writing once removed. Taciturn pictures carry evocative and ungainly verbal appendages in the form of elliptical press releases or titles like Large Obsessed with Hector Guimard, 2008, a nod to the architect of Paris's Art Nouveau metro stations, or If I Paint Crowned I've Had It, Got Me, 2008, a telling paraphrase of Cézanne explaining he would be ruined if he tried to paint the "crowned" effect of a still life rather than the thing itself.

Selected bibliography

Book appearances
 Biesenbach, K. Greater New York 2005 (2005)
 Fyfe, J. 2006 Artist in Residence Biennial (2006)
 Nicklas, B. Painting Abstraction: New Elements in Abstract Painting (2009)
 Bonami, F. and Carrion, Murayari, G. Whitney Biennial 2010 (2010)
 Navarro, M. Abstraction Racional (2011)
 Bazzini, M. and Ferri, D. The Inevitable Figuration: The Painting Scene Today (2013)
 Hoptman, L. The Forever Now: Contemporary Painting in an Atemporal World (2014)
 Hudson, S. Painting Now (2015)
 Barliant, C. Richard Aldrich: MDD (2017)

Article appearances
 Bellini, A. "Paranorma Pittura," Flash Art Italia (2004)
 Saltz, J. "Dire Diary," The Village Voice (2005)
 Smith, R. "Menace, Glitter and Rock in Visions of Dystopia," The New York Times (2006)
 Klein, J. "Bunch Alliance and Dissolve," Art Papers (2007)
 Butler, C. "Looking Back: Emerging Artists," frieze (2008)
 Rothkopf, S. "Openings: Richard Aldrich," Artforum (2009) 
 Fiduccia, J. & Holte, M.N. "New Abstract Painting," Kaleidoscope
 Kitamura, K. "Time Again," Art Monthly (2011)
 Nagoya, S. "September," Flash Art (2012)
 Moore, T. & Coley, B. "Bull Tongue," Arthur (2013)
 Eastham, B. "Painting is a Painting is a Painting," Elephant (2014)
 Caws, M.A. "Seeing it Now," The Brooklyn Rail (2015)
 Sutherland, C. "Richard Aldrich on the plurality of painting," The Japan Times (2016)
 Haddad, N. "Richard Aldrich's Elliptical Paths Through Language," Hyperallergic (2018)
 Tanaka, Y. "Abstraction: Aspects of Contemporary Art," The Japan Times (2019)

References

External links
Frieze Magazine
Richard Aldrich exhibitions
Saatchi Gallery
Bortolami Gallery

20th-century American painters
20th-century American male artists
American male painters
21st-century American painters
21st-century American male artists
1975 births
Living people